Roman Yuriyovych Pidkivka (born 9 May 1995) is a Ukrainian professional footballer who plays as a goalkeeper.

Career
Pidkivka is the product of the Karpaty Lviv Youth School System.

He made his debut for FC Karpaty playing against FC Vorskla Poltava on 14 July 2013 in Ukrainian Premier League.

In February 2019, Pidkivka moved to Arsenal Kyiv on a free transfer. He made his league debut for the club on 24 February 2019 in a 2–0 away defeat to FC Desna.

References

External links
 
 
 

1995 births
Living people
Sportspeople from Lviv
Ukrainian footballers
FC Karpaty Lviv players
FC Arsenal Kyiv players
FC Chornomorets Odesa players
Association football goalkeepers
Ukrainian Premier League players
Ukrainian First League players
Ukraine youth international footballers
Ukraine under-21 international footballers